Begonia dregei, the maple leaf begonia or grape-leaf begonia, is a species of flowering plant in the genus Begonia native to South Africa. It has gained the Royal Horticultural Society's Award of Garden Merit.

References

dregei
Endemic flora of South Africa
Plants described in 1857